The following highways are numbered 810:

Costa Rica
 National Route 810

United States